Germaria is a genus of flies in the family Tachinidae.

Species
G. angustata (Zetterstedt, 1844)
G. barbara Mesnil, 1963
G. graeca (Brauer & Bergenstamm, 1889)
G. hermonensis Kugler, 1980
G. hispanica Mesnil, 1963
G. nudinerva Mesnil, 1963
G. ruficeps (Fallén, 1820)
G. vicina Mesnil, 1963
G. violaceiventris Enderlein, 1934

References

Tachininae
Tachinidae genera
Taxa named by Jean-Baptiste Robineau-Desvoidy